The First State Bank of Hazel, located on Main St. west of its junction with Highway 22 in Hazel, South Dakota, was built in 1901.  It has also been known as Farmers State Bank of Hazel.  It was listed on the National Register of Historic Places in 1997.

It is a brick one-story flat-roof commercial style building.

It was deemed notable "for its contribution to commerce and economic development in Hazel, South Dakota" and for its architecture, as "a representative example of an early 20th century commercial building."  It is in fact the only surviving architecturally intact historic commercial building in Hazel.

References

Bank buildings on the National Register of Historic Places in South Dakota
Neoclassical architecture in South Dakota
Early Commercial architecture in the United States
Buildings and structures completed in 1901
Hamlin County, South Dakota